Lucas Sánchez (born 12 December 1997) is an Argentine professional footballer who plays as a left-back for Unión de Sunchales.

Career
Sánchez's career started with Santamarina. Héctor Arzubialde awarded Sánchez his professional bow during the 2017–18 Primera B Nacional campaign, with the defender being subbed on with ten minutes remaining of a draw with Flandria on 1 April 2018. In the following season, 2018–19, Sánchez started in their first seven league games, which culminated with his first career goal coming on 5 November versus Chacarita Juniors.

Career statistics
.

References

External links

1997 births
Living people
Place of birth missing (living people)
Argentine footballers
Association football defenders
Primera Nacional players
Club y Biblioteca Ramón Santamarina footballers
Unión de Sunchales footballers